Tomares romanovi, or Romanoff's hairstreak, is a butterfly of the family Lycaenidae. It is found in Armenia, Azerbaijan, Georgia, eastern Turkey, northern Iran, and Kopet Dagh mountains.

The wingspan is 28–30 mm. The species inhabits calcareous grasslands and arid mountain steppes, usually dominated by tragacanth locoweeds. It occupies elevation range from 1200 to 1600 m above sea level. The butterfly flies from late April to mid-June depending on latitude and elevation.

The larvae feed on the Astragalus species A. scharuhdensis and A. finitimus.

Subspecies
 Tomares romanovi romanovi (Armenia, Nakhichevan)
 Tomares romanovi cachetinus Nekrutenko, 1978 (Georgia)
 Tomares romanovi cyprius Stichel, 1911 (Talysh, Kopet-Dagh)
 Tomares romanovi maculifera (Staudinger, [1892])

References

External links
 "Tomares Rambur, 1840" at Markku Savela's Lepidoptera and Some Other Life Forms
 Butterfly Conservation Armenia

Theclinae
Butterflies described in 1882
Butterflies of Europe
Butterflies of Asia
Taxa named by Hugo Theodor Christoph